Cyanide SA (also known as Cyanide Studio) is a French video game developer based in the Nanterre suburb of Paris. The company was founded in 2000 by Patrick Pligersdorffer, formerly of Ubi Soft. Since 2007, Cyanide operates a second studio, Amusement Cyanide, in Montreal, Canada, and employs a total of 110 staff members as of 2018. Cyanide was acquired by French publisher Bigben Interactive (now Nacon) in May 2018.

Big Bad Wolf, founded in 2015 at Bordeaux, and Rogue Factor, founded in 2013 at Montréal, are branches of Cyanide.

History 
Before founding Cyanide, Patrick Pligersdorffer began working in the video game industry with Ubi Soft, where he assisted the opening of an internal development studio in Japan. After leaving Ubi Soft, Pligersdorffer established Cyanide in Nanterre in 2000. In November 2007, Cyanide announced that they had set up a new studio in Montreal, Canada. At the time, the new studio, known as Amusement Cyanide, was tasked with creating a new proprietary 3D animation engine for a game that was in development at Cyanide's headquarters. By this time, Cyanide employed 110 people in its two studios. Focus Home Interactive, Cyanide's primary publisher, previously also attempted to take over the studio, but was rejected by the developer's supervisory board, which eventually led to the resignation of Focus Home Interactive's chief executive officer, Cédric Lagarrigue.

Developed titles

Games by Cyanide

Games by Amusement Cyanide

Games by Big Bad Wolf

Games by Rogue Factor

References

External links 
 

Companies based in Île-de-France
Nanterre
Video game companies established in 2000
French companies established in 2000
Video game companies of France
Video game development companies
2018 mergers and acquisitions
Nacon